The Wickiana is recognized as one of the most significant collections of news reports and documents pertaining to current events dating from the 16th century in the form of single-leaf and illustrated broadsheets, pamphlets, prints, handwritten texts and drawings. These time capsules form one of the most important archives pertaining to a particular epoch, namely that of the Reformation in Switzerland. Johann Jakob Wick (1522-1588), after whom the collection is named, was the clergyman at the Predigerkirche and its associated hospital in Zürich from 1552 and then second Archdeacon, and thus also canon, at the Grossmünster in Zürich from 1557. He assembled and arranged contemporary news documents chronologically between 1559 and 1588, also integrating further material from the period running approximately from 1505 until 1559 into his collection.

Contents
Wick's collection is bound in 24 folio volumes, which were housed in the Grossmünster Stiftsbibliothek after Wick's death in 1588 and subsequently transferred to the Zürich Stadtbibliothek in 1836. In addition to a vast number of prints from the German-speaking countries, the collection also contains 52 items in other languages. Many of the sheets emanate from the most important centres for printing and book production at that period – Augsburg, Nürnberg and Strassburg.

In pictures and texts, the documents bear witness to contemporary life, reporting on such phenomena as natural occurrences – comets, earthquakes and floods, physical deformities in animals and humans, sensational crimes and political events of the time. For example, the comet of 1577 is described as “terrible and wondrous” (“schrecklich und wunderbarlich”). The collection can be regarded as manifesting the climate of crisis at a time of religious and political turmoil: Huldrych Zwingli (died 1531) had recently predicted the end of the world. Wick's collection of documents may have been regarded by him and his contemporaries as harbingers of the Last Judgment.

Access
439 illustrated broadsheets (woodcuts), 429 of which belong to the original collection. 10 were added later. In 1925, these illustrated broadsheets were removed from Johann Jakob Wick's manuscript volumes and archived separately in the Department of Prints and Drawings of the Zentralbibliothek Zürich (Graphische Sammlung). All the rest of the documents, Wick's entire collection,  are housed in the Department of Manuscripts in the Zentralbibliothek Zürich (Handschriftenabteilung).

See also
Swiss illustrated chronicles
History of Zürich
Historiography of Switzerland
Reformation in Switzerland

Examples

References
M. Senn,  Die Wickiana. Johann Jakob Wicks Nachrichtensammlung aus dem 16. Jahrhundert, Zürich 1975.
Franz Matthias Mauelshagen, Wunderkammer auf Papier. Die Wickiana zwischen Reformation und Volksglaube, Diss. Univ. Zürich, Zürich 2008.
Wolfgang Harms, Michael Schilling (eds.), Die Wickiana. Die Sammlung der Zentralbibliothek Zürich, Tübingen 1997–2005.

External links

  Zentralbibliothek Zürich

History of Zürich